Lima lima, or the spiny fileclam, is a species of bivalve mollusc in the family Limidae.

Description
The surface of the valves show 18-24 strong ribs covered with small scales. These clams are filter feeders.

Distribution and habitat
This species can be found in the Mediterranean Sea, in the Eastern Atlantic and in Caribbean waters, ranging from southern Florida to the West Indies and Bermuda.

References

Further reading
Abbott, R.T. & Morris, P.A. A Field Guide to Shells: Atlantic and Gulf Coasts and the West Indies. New York: Houghton Mifflin, 1995. 32.
Egidio Trainito; Mauro Doneddu, Conchiglie del Mediterraneo, 2005ª ed., Milano, Il Castello, 2005.

External links
WoRMS
PESI
Malakos

Limidae
Bivalves described in 1758
Taxa named by Carl Linnaeus